Narayanganj Government Mohila College, generally called Mohila College (মহিলা কলেজ) is a women's college in Narayanganj, Bangladesh. Narayanganj Government Mohila College one of the major educational institution for women's education in the district.

History
In the Development of women Education of Society Narayanganj Women college was formed By Civil Society in 1962. Due to infrastructure problems, the college was transferred to Municipal Public Library Building in 1963.  Later new campus and their own academic building was built in donated place by Government Tolaram College in 1965. The college was mass destructed in liberation period in 1971. As a result, after Independence it was transferred Government Girls High School for its activities such as class and other curriculums. Former President Hussain Muhammad Ershad on 1 November 1984 declared it a Government College.

Academic departments
 HSC
 Department of Arts
 Department of Business Studies
 Department of Science  
 Information and Communication Technology
 Department of Sociology

Library
There are available Library facility for students. Around thousand books are in the library in various department.

Transport

Tolaram University college has 01 bus to transport students from different areas of Narayanganj city.

References

External links
   Confine Principal Dhaka Tribune Published 16 July 2014.

Educational institutions established in 1962
Colleges affiliated to National University, Bangladesh
Universities and colleges in Narayanganj District
Colleges in Narayanganj District
Education in Narayanganj
Women's universities and colleges in Bangladesh
1962 establishments in East Pakistan